The 9th LG Cup featured:

12 players from  South Korea - Cho Hanseung, Cho Hunhyun, Choi Cheol-han, Choi Won Yong, Kim Mansoo, Lee Chang-ho, Lee Sedol, Mok Jin-seok, Park Seunghyun, Song Tae Kon, Won Seong-jin, Yoo Changhyuk
5 players from   Japan - Cho U, Hane Naoki, O Meien, O Rissei, Yamashita Keigo
4 players from  China - Gu Li, Kong Jie, Yu Bin, Zhou Heyang
1 player from  Taiwan - Zhou Junxun
1 player from  North America - Jiang Mingjiu
1 player from  Europe - Franz-Josef Dickhut

Out of the 24 (16 of which competed in the main tournament below), 2 players were given automatic berths. These were Lee Chang-ho, the winner of the 8th LG Cup, and the runner up, Mok Jin-seok.

Knockout stages

Final

LG Cup (Go)
2005 in go